Rotaliotina is a genus of small sea snails, marine gastropod mollusks in the family Liotiidae.

Species
Species within the genus Rotaliotina include:
 Rotaliotina discoidea (Reeve, 1843)
 Rotaliotina springsteeni (McLean, 1988)

References

 Huang, Shih-I. (2023). Nomenclatural notes on fossil liotiid taxa and description of Cyclostrema filipino n. sp. from the Philippines (Mollusca: Gastropoda, Liotiidae). Bulletin of Malacology, Taiwan. 46: 24-46.

External links
 

 
Liotiidae